The Shvetsov M-25 was an aircraft radial engine produced in the Soviet Union (USSR) in the 1930s and 1940s, a licensed production variant of the Wright R-1820-F3.

Design and development
The first M-25s were produced from kits imported from the United States; the main difference between the later M-25 and the R-1820-F3 was the use of metric components. 13,888 M-25s were produced in the USSR at factories in Perm and Kazan. There were a number of sub-variants which differed from the original M-25 in that they had reduction gears, rather than direct drive. Performance was similar to the equivalent Wright engines. The M-25 was later developed into the ASh-62 and was later used as a pattern for the M-70. The M-70, a twin-row 18-cylinder engine, eventually developed into the ASh-73 which powered the Tupolev Tu-4, an unlicensed, reverse-engineered copy of the Boeing B-29 Superfortress.

Applications
 Gotha Go 244
 Kharkiv KhAI-5bis
 Tupolev I-14
 Polikarpov I-15bis 
 Polikarpov I-153
 Polikarpov I-16

Specifications (Shvetsov M-25)

See also

References

 
 

1930s aircraft piston engines
Aircraft air-cooled radial piston engines
Shvetsov aircraft engines
Soviet Union–United States relations